Chuanqi Huangdi Zhu Yuanzhang is a Chinese television series based on the life of Zhu Yuanzhang, the founding emperor of the Ming dynasty. Starring Chen Baoguo as the emperor, the series was first broadcast on CCTV in mainland China in 2006.

Cast
 Chen Baoguo as Hongwu Emperor
 Xu Fan as Empress Ma
 Hou Tianlai as Hu Weiyong
 Tang Guoqiang as Guo Zixing
 Zhao Jing as Guo Zixing's wife
 Ma Yue as Li Xingfang
 Zeng Li as Guo Ninglian
 Jiang Hua as Li Shanchang
 Pan Yueming as Zhu Biao
 Deng Ying as Chu Fangyu
 Kadi Linna as Dalan
 Bian Xiaoxiao as Guo Hui
 Du Zhenqing as Liao Yongzhong
 Hong Tao as Liu Bowen
 Shi Weijian as Song Lian
 Lin Ke as Yunqi
 Li Jiacun as Qian Wansan
 Jiang Chao as Qian Da
 Zhao Wanyi as Jinju
 Li Hanjun as Lan Yu
 Li Qiankuan as Zhang Yi

See also
 Founding Emperor of Ming Dynasty

External links
  Chuanqi Huangdi Zhu Yuanzhang on Sina.com
  Chuanqi Huangdi Zhu Yuanzhang on xinhuanet.com

2006 Chinese television series debuts
Television series set in the Ming dynasty
Mandarin-language television shows
China Central Television original programming
Chinese historical television series
Television series set in the 14th century